The First Biesheuvel cabinet was the executive branch of the Dutch Government from 6 July 1971 until 9 August 1972. The cabinet was formed by the christian-democratic Catholic People's Party (KVP), Anti-Revolutionary Party (ARP) and Christian Historical Union (CHU), the conservative-liberal People's Party for Freedom and Democracy (VVD) and the social-democratic Democratic Socialists '70 (DS'70) after the election of 1971. The cabinet was a centrist coalition and had a slim majority in the House of Representatives with Protestant Leader Barend Biesheuvel a former Minister of Agriculture serving as Prime Minister. Prominent Catholic politician Roelof Nelissen the Minister of Economic Affairs in the previous cabinet served as Deputy Prime Minister, Minister of Finance and was given the portfolio of Suriname and Netherlands Antilles Affairs, former Liberal Leader Molly Geertsema served as Deputy Prime Minister and Minister of the Interior.

The cabinet served in the early years of the radical 1970s. Domestically it had to deal with the peak of the counterculture and a growing inflation but it was able to implement several social reforms to the public sector and stimulating deregulation and privatization. The cabinet suffered several major internal conflicts between the cabinet members of the Democratic Socialists '70 and the rest of the coalition which lead to the fall of the cabinet just 1 year into its term on 19 July 1972 with the Democratic Socialists '70 cabinet members resigning on 21 July 1972 and the cabinet continued in a demissionary capacity until it was replaced with the caretaker Second Biesheuvel cabinet on 9 August 1972.

Term
Problems of the cabinet were the release of war criminals (three of Breda) and the increasing inflation, combined with a stagnating economy (stagflation). The decision to cut government expenses was not supported by DS'70, so the cabinet lost its majority in the parliament, resulting in Biesheuvel II.

Minister Stuyt, the first minister for environmental affairs, issued an urgency-note concerning the environment. In 1972, the first report from the Club of Rome was published, which showed that the environment is in a bad state worldwide and that resources will eventually run out.

The cabinet recognised the GDR and voted to allow China back into the United Nations.

Cabinet Members

Trivia
 Six cabinet members (later) served as Party Leaders and Lijsttrekkers: Barend Biesheuvel (1963–1973) of the Anti-Revolutionary Party, Molly Geertsema (1969–1971) of the People's Party for Freedom and Democracy, Norbert Schmelzer (1963–1971) of the Catholic People's Party, Dries van Agt (1976–1982) of the Christian Democratic Appeal, Willem Drees Jr. (1971–1977) of the Democratic Socialists '70, Bé Udink (1970–1971) and Roelof Kruisinga (1971–1977) of the Christian Historical Union.
 Five cabinet members had previous experience as scholars and professors: Dries van Agt (Criminal Law and Procedure), Louis Stuyt (Internal Medicine), Willem Drees Jr. (Public Economics), Kees Boertien (Commercial Law) and Roelof Kruisinga (Otorhinolaryngology).
 Four cabinet members (later) served as Queen's Commissioner: Molly Geertsema (Gelderland), Dries van Agt (North Brabant), Kees Boertien (Zeeland) and Henk Vonhoff (Groningen).

References

External links
Official

  Kabinet-Biesheuvel I en II Parlement & Politiek
  Kabinet-Biesheuvel Rijksoverheid

Cabinets of the Netherlands
1971 establishments in the Netherlands
1972 disestablishments in the Netherlands
Cabinets established in 1971
Cabinets disestablished in 1972